
Hans Hecker (26 February 1895 – 1 May 1979) was a German general during World War II who commanded several divisions. He was a recipient of the Knight's Cross of the Iron Cross of Nazi Germany.

Awards and decorations

 Knight's Cross of the Iron Cross on 5 August 1940 as Oberstleutnant and commander of Pionier-Battalion 29 (mot.)

References

Citations

Bibliography

 
 

1895 births
1979 deaths
Military personnel from Duisburg
Major generals of the German Army (Wehrmacht)
German Army personnel of World War I
Recipients of the Gold German Cross
Recipients of the Knight's Cross of the Iron Cross
Recipients of the Silver Medal of Military Valor
German prisoners of war in World War II
People from the Rhine Province
Recipients of the clasp to the Iron Cross, 1st class